Nepticuloidea is a superfamily of usually very small monotrysian moths that are characterised by small or large eyecaps over the compound eyes.
It comprises two families, the "pigmy moths" (Nepticulidae), with 12 genera which are very diverse worldwide and are usually leaf miners, and the "white eyecap moths" (Opostegidae), also worldwide but with five genera and about a ninth as many species, whose biology is less well known (Davis, 1999).

References
Davis, D.R. (1999). The Monotrysian Heteroneura. Ch. 6, pp. 65–90 in Kristensen, N.P. (Ed.). Lepidoptera, Moths and Butterflies. Volume 1: Evolution, Systematics, and Biogeography. Handbuch der Zoologie. Eine Naturgeschichte der Stämme des Tierreiches / Handbook of Zoology. A Natural History of the phyla of the Animal Kingdom. Band / Volume IV Arthropoda: Insecta Teilband / Part 35: 491 pp. Walter de Gruyter, Berlin, New York.

Sources
Firefly Encyclopedia of Insects and Spiders, edited by Christopher O'Toole, 2002

External links
Tree of Life

 
Lepidoptera superfamilies